Eluveitie is a Swiss folk metal band from Winterthur, Zürich founded by Chrigel Glanzmann. The band has released 8 studio albums, 2 live albums, 3 compilation albums, 17 music videos, 16 singles and 1 demo album.

Albums

Studio albums

Live albums

Compilation albums

Demo albums

Singles

Music videos

References

Discographies of Swiss artists
Heavy metal group discographies